Moose Jaw Municipal Airport  is a general aviation facility located  east north-east of Moose Jaw, Saskatchewan, Canada.

It has a single paved runway and series of hangars and support structures.

Ground transportation 
The airport is connected with Moose Jaw by Highway 301 (connecting with the Trans-Canada Highway - Saskatchewan Highway of Heroes) to the west side of the airport. A dirt drive leads out to the road. Cars can park along the grass / dirt next to the tarmac.

Tenants

 Skydive South Sask - a Regina-based skydiving school which uses the airport as drop zone
 Moose Jaw Flying Club
 Provincial Airways - fixed-base operator

History

During the Second World War the Royal Canadian Air Force used this site  as the secondary relief landing field (R2) for No. 32 Service Flying Training School located at RCAF Station Moose Jaw. The facility was named "RCAF Aerodrome Burdick, Saskatchewan".

See also 
 List of airports in Saskatchewan
 Moose Jaw/Air Vice Marshal C.M. McEwen Airport - larger military airport located south of Moose Jaw
 Moose Jaw (Dr. F. H. Wigmore Regional Hospital) Heliport
 Regina International Airport - closest public civil airport

References 

Registered aerodromes in Saskatchewan
Buildings and structures in Moose Jaw
Moose Jaw No. 161, Saskatchewan
Transport in Moose Jaw
Airports of the British Commonwealth Air Training Plan